Thomas Heath may refer to:
Thomas Heath (classicist) (1861–1940), British civil servant, mathematician, classical scholar, historian of ancient Greek mathematics, translator, and mountaineer
Thomas Heath (cricketer) (1806–1872), cricketer 
Thomas Kurton Heath (1853–1938), vaudeville actor
Tommy Heath (born 1947), musician
Tommy Heath (baseball) (1913–1967), American catcher, scout and baseball manager
Thomas Heth (fl. 1583), also Heath, English mathematician

See also
Thomas Hethe, MP for Suffolk